

Disorders of the skin
Athlete's foot
Callus and Corns of the Skin
Onychocryptosis (Ingrown Toenail)
Keratosis palmaris et plantaris

Disorders of the joints
Arthritis mutilans
Hallux valgus (bunion)
Hallux varus
Diabetic Arthropathy (Charcot Foot)
Rheumatoid arthritis
Osteoarthritis

Disorders of the bones
Fracture
Jones Fracture
Dupuytren fracture or Pott's fracture
Osteomyelitis
Bone cancer

Disorders of the nerves
Tarsal tunnel syndrome
Neuroma
Metatarsalgia
Nerve entrapment

Combined disorders
Pes cavus (Cavus foot)
Club foot

Genetic disorders
Polydactyly

Specific manifestations of systemic disease
Diabetic foot
Rheumatoid foot
Neuropathy
Plantar fasciitis

Foot and ankle disorders